August Lepik (also August Leppik; 6 February 1881 –  27 February 1955) was an Estonian politician. He was born in Pudivere, Lääne-Viru County. He was a member of Estonian National Assembly.

References

1881 births
1955 deaths
Members of the Estonian National Assembly
People from Väike-Maarja Parish